Wally Farquhar (22 February 1875 – 31 May 1960) was an Australian cricketer. He played eleven first-class matches for New South Wales between 1894/95 and 1903/04.

See also
 List of New South Wales representative cricketers

References

External links
 

1875 births
1960 deaths
Australian cricketers
New South Wales cricketers
People from Maitland, New South Wales
Cricketers from New South Wales